Savigny's agama (Trapelus savignii)  is a species of lizard in the family Agamidae. The species is native to the Levant.

Etymology
Both the specific name, savignii, and the common name, Savigny's agama, are in honor of French zoologist Marie Jules César Savigny.

Geographic range
T. savignii is found in Egypt, Israel, and the Palestinian territories.

Habitat
The natural habitats of T. savignii are subtropical or tropical dry shrubland, subtropical or tropical dry lowland grassland, and hot deserts.

Conservation status
T. savignii is threatened by habitat loss.

Diet
The main source of water for Savigny's agama is its food, which consist of vegetables, insects, and small lizards.

Description

Sources

References

Further reading
Duméril AMC, Bibron G (1837). Erpétologie générale ou Histoire naturelle complète des Reptiles, Tome quatrième [Volume 4]. Paris: Roret. ii + 571 pp. (Agama savignii, new species, pp. 508–509). (in French).

Trapelus
Lizards of Asia
Reptiles described in 1837
Taxa named by André Marie Constant Duméril
Taxa named by Gabriel Bibron
Taxonomy articles created by Polbot